Marshall Nyasha Munetsi (born 22 June 1996) is a Zimbabwean professional footballer who plays as a midfielder for  club Reims and the Zimbabwe national team.

Club career

Early career
Munetsi was signed by South African National First Division side Cape Town in July 2015. The team released a statement saying that he was "...in the mould of a typical Yaya Touré. Big‚ strong‚ mobile and a good passer of the ball." He made his professional debut on 26 September 2015 during a 3–1 loss to Black Leopards, and scored his first goal in a derby match against Milano United on 16 April 2016, where it ended up being the winning goal in a 1–0 game. He attended trials with the Orlando Pirates, a team in the Premier Division, in December 2015.

Reims
On 11 June 2019, Munetsi signed for Ligue 1 club Reims on a four-year deal.

International career
Munetsi was called up to the national team ahead of the 2019 Africa Cup of Nations in Egypt.

Career statistics

Scores and results list Zimbabwe's goal tally first, score column indicates score after each Munetsi goal.

Honours
Zimbabwe
 COSAFA Cup: 2018

References

External links
 
 Marshall Munetsi at Soccerpunter
 

Living people
1996 births
Zimbabwean footballers
Zimbabwe international footballers
Association football midfielders
F.C. Cape Town players
Baroka F.C. players
Orlando Pirates F.C. players
Stade de Reims players
Ligue 1 players
Zimbabwean expatriate footballers
Zimbabwean expatriate sportspeople in South Africa
Zimbabwean expatriate sportspeople in France
Expatriate soccer players in South Africa
Expatriate footballers in France
Sportspeople from Bulawayo
2019 Africa Cup of Nations players